Hung Kai-chun (born 4 March 1987) is a Taiwanese football player who plays as a midfielder for the Taiwan Power Company.

International career

International goals
Scores and results list Chinese Taipei's goal tally first.

Honours 
Taiwan Power Company
Winner
 Intercity Football League (3): 2011, 2012, 2014
 AFC President's Cup: 2011

Runners-up
 Intercity Football League: 2013

References

External links 
 

1987 births
Living people
Taiwanese footballers
Chinese Taipei international footballers
Association football midfielders